Ha Hee-ra (born October 29, 1969) is a South Korean actress. Ha began her acting career in 1981 when she was in the sixth grade, appearing mostly in films for teenagers.  Among her dramas are What Women Want (1990), What Is Love (1991), The Break of Dawn (1993), Catching Up with Gangnam Moms (2007) and The President (2010).

Early life 
Ha Hee-ra was born in Seongbuk District, Seoul, South Korea to a Taiwanese father and a Korean mother. Through her paternal grandfather, she is a third-generation descendant of Chinese immigrants to Korea and due to her paternal lineage, she was issued with Taiwanese citizenship. Because she was of mixed Chinese and Korean descent, Ha was often teased during her youth. She attended and graduated from Seokgwan Elementary School, Jongam Middle School and Seokgwan High School in Seoul. She later attended Dongguk and Yonsei Universities, where she graduated in Bachelor of Education and Master of Social Welfare.

Personal life
She married actor Choi Soo-jong in November 1993, and obtained South Korean citizenship after their wedding. Following her marriage to Choi, she converted to Presbyterianism from Buddhism.  The couple have two children: son Min-seo and daughter Yoon-seo.

Filmography

Film

Television series

Television show

Theater

Awards and nominations

References

External links
Ha Hee-ra at GH Entertainment 
Ha Hee-ra Fan Cafe at Daum 

1969 births
Living people
Actresses from Seoul
South Korean television actresses
South Korean film actresses
South Korean musical theatre actresses
South Korean stage actresses
South Korean people of Taiwanese descent
Naturalized citizens of South Korea
Dongguk University alumni
Yonsei University alumni
South Korean Presbyterians
Former Buddhists
Best Actress Paeksang Arts Award (television) winners